The Captain Is a Lady is a 1940 American comedy film directed by Robert B. Sinclair and written by Henry Clark, adapted from the play by Rachel Crothers. The film stars Charles Coburn, Beulah Bondi, Virginia Grey, Helen Broderick, Billie Burke and Dan Dailey. It was released on June 21, 1940, by Metro-Goldwyn-Mayer.

Plot
Captain Peabody and his wife Angie are kicked out of their home, Angie finds a place at a retirement home. Unfortunately, only single women are allowed to stay, so the Captain has to find a place of his own and say goodbye to Angie. But then, the ladies from the retirement home feel bad for the couple and let them both in. The captain now sees himself surrounded only by ladies and being called "Old lady" by his crew-mates and wants his manhood back.

Cast 
 Charles Coburn as Captain Abe Peabody
 Beulah Bondi as Angie Peabody
 Virginia Grey as Mary Peabody
 Helen Broderick as Nancy Crocker
 Billie Burke as Blossy Stort
 Dan Dailey as Perth Nickerson 
 Helen Westley as Abigail Morrow
 Cecil Cunningham as Mrs. Jane Homans
 Marjorie Main as Sarah May Willett
 Clem Bevans as Samuel Darby
 Francis Pierlot as Roger Bartlett
 Tom Fadden as Pucey Kintner

References

External links 
 
 
 
 

1940 films
American comedy films
1940 comedy films
Metro-Goldwyn-Mayer films
Films directed by Robert B. Sinclair
Films scored by Bronisław Kaper
American black-and-white films
1940s English-language films
1940s American films